Ternat is a commune in the Haute-Marne department in north-eastern France.

See also
Communes of the Haute-Marne department

References

External links

 Gazetteer Entry for Ternat

Communes of Haute-Marne